Holopedium is the sole genus of water fleas in the family Holopediidae. There are about seven described species in Holopedium.

Species
These seven species belong to the genus Holopedium:
 Holopedium acidophilum Rowe, Adamowicz & Hebert, 2007
 Holopedium amazonicum Stingelin, 1904
 Holopedium atlanticum Rowe, Adamowicz & Hebert, 2007
 Holopedium gibberum Zaddach, 1855
 Holopedium glacialis Rowe, Adamowicz & Hebert, 2007
 Holopedium groenlandicum Korovchinsky, 2005
 Holopedium ramasarmii Rao, Naidu & Padmaja, 1998

References

Further reading

 

Cladocera
Articles created by Qbugbot